The Usedom Botanical Gardens, Mellenthin (60,000 m²) is a private botanical garden located at Chausseeberg 1, Mellenthin, Usedom, Mecklenburg-Vorpommern, Germany. It is open daily in the warmer months; an admission fee is charged.

The garden was constructed between 2006—2008 and opened on May 1, 2009. It contains about 50,000 plants representing approximately 1,000 taxa that are winter-hardy on the Baltic Sea island of Usedom. Plants are arranged by botanical classification in 14 garden areas, with labels in Latin, German, and Polish:

 Green Garden - a conifer collection with evergreen ground cover, as well as about 8000 tulips, azalea, ground cover roses, and Erica tetralix.
 Early Flower Gardens - late spring and early summer perennials, hyacinths, chestnut trees, and a hedge of Spiraea x vanhouttei.
 Rose Garden - more than 100 rose varieties.
 Late Flower Garden - herbaceous plants flowering in late summer and autumn.
 Garden on a Slope - three fieldstone terraces displaying both early- and late-blooming perennials, with over 150 Clematis and more than 250 Phlox subulata.
 Lawn - a large pond and creeks, seating and picnic facilities, edged with Syringa vulgaris, Carpinus betulus, and Fagus sylvatica purpurea.
 Woods - natural forest with walking paths.
 Kitchen Garden - fruit trees and bushes including apple (Malus), pear (Pyrus), cherry (Prunus cerasus), and peach (Prunus persica), as well as a small vineyard with a variety of grapes (Vitis) and hedges of Lonicera xylosteum and Humulus lupulus.
 Heather Garden - Calluna vulgaris and Erica carnea, as well as 7000 tulips, with hedges of Hippophae rhamnoides and Taxus baccata.
 Herb Garden - about 20 types of culinary herbs.
 Rhododendron garden - More than 700 rhododendrons, with hydrangea and hibiscus.
 Ziersträuchergarten - Bird garden.
 Ponds and water gardens
 Rock garden

See also 
 List of botanical gardens in Germany

References 
 Usedoms Botanischer Garten Mellenthin
 Garden videos (YouTube)

Botanical gardens in Germany
Gardens in Mecklenburg-Western Pomerania
Usedom